"Stranger Things" is a song recorded by Norwegian DJ and record producer Kygo, featuring American pop rock band OneRepublic. It was composed by Kygo, Ryan Tedder and Casey Smith, with lyrics written by Tedder and production handled by Kygo. It was released on 24 January 2018 by Sony and Ultra Music, as the second single from Kygo's second studio album, Kids in Love (2017). Alan Walker remixed this song in February 2018.

Critical reception
Kat Bein of Billboard deemed the song an "emotive pop ballad" with "a slow, steady build". David Rishty of the same publication wrote that it "taps into some Bruce Springsteen vibes with strumming guitars, underground narratives and a pushing voice". Mike Wass of Idolator named the song "one of the most anthemic" on the album.

Music video
The accompanying music video was directed by Tim Mattia. It depicts a love story of a young couple, who are tired of their jobs at the diner and mechanic's office. Intercut with clips of them drinking beers in chained-fence yards and buying groceries, they later broke into a mansion in Los Angeles, where they make out in their underwear. The female partner was eventually caught by the police.

Credits and personnel
Credits adapted from Tidal.
 Kygo – composition, production
 Ryan Tedder – composition, lyrics
 Casey Smith – composition
 Alex Spencer – mix engineering
 Erik Madrid – mix engineering
 Sören von Malmborg – master engineering

Charts

Weekly charts

Year-end charts

Certifications

References

2017 songs
2018 singles
Kygo songs
OneRepublic songs
Pop ballads
Song recordings produced by Kygo
Songs written by Kygo
Songs written by Ryan Tedder
Sony Music singles
Ultra Music singles